Kollimalai is a taluk of Namakkal district in the Indian state of Tamil Nadu.

Villages in Kollimalai Taluk
 Bail Nadu
 valavanthi nadu
 cithoor nadu
 devanur nadu
 edapuli nadu
 gundur nadu
 kunduni nadu
 perakarai nadu
 selur nadu
 thinnanur nadu
 alathur nadu
 thirupuli nadu
 ariyur nadu
 valappur nadu

Sources 
 http://soki.in/category/kolli-hills-namakkal-tamil-nadu

Taluks of Namakkal district